A headstone is a grave marker.

Headstone may also refer to:

 Headstone, London, an area of London, England
 Headstones (band), a Canadian rock band
 Headstones (album), an album by Lake of Tears
 Bradley Headstone, a character in the novel Our Mutual Friend

See also
 Headstone Lane railway station, in London
 Headstone Manor, a part of Harrow Museum
 Tombstone (disambiguation)